The 1993 WAFU Club Championship was the 17th  football club tournament season that took place for the runners-up or third place of each West African country's domestic league, the West African Club Championship. It was won by Nigeria's Bendel Insurance after defeating Benin's Mogas FC in two legs.  A total of about 37 goals were scored, slightly more but not as much as it was in 1991. Originally a 24 match season, it was reduced to a 17 match as neither clubs from the Gambia, Guinea Bissau, Mauritania and Niger participated.  Only one club each, Freetown United abandoned after the first leg, later Liberia's Invincible Eleven were disqualified in the quarterfinals.  Stade Malien directly played their first match in the semis as no participant were in the first two stages.  From the first round, Bendel Insurance directly headed to the semis.

Preliminary round

|}

Quarterfinals

|}

Semifinals

|}

Finals

|}

Winners

See also
1993 African Cup of Champions Clubs
1993 CAF Cup Winners' Cup
1993 CAF Cup

Notes

References

External links
Full results of the 1993 WAFU Club Championship at RSSSF

West African Club Championship
1993 in African football